Pleasures and Palaces is a musical with a book by Frank Loesser and Sam Spewack and music and lyrics by Loesser. It is based on Spewack's flop 1961 play Once There Was a Russian  and takes its title from the opening lyrics of the 1823 song "Home, Sweet Home": "Mid pleasures and palaces though we may roam, Be it ever so humble, there's no place like home."

Plot summary
In this comic look at actual historical events, John Paul Jones enters into the service of the Empress Catherine II of Russia in 1788, specifically to fight the Turks and recapture Constantinople for Russia, and becomes involved in political intrigue and romantic complications. Catherine is in love with Grigori Alexandrovich Potemkin, who is enamored with the murderous Sura, who finds herself torn between Potemkin and Jones.

Productions
The Broadway-bound production, directed and choreographed by Bob Fosse, opened on March 11, 1965, at the Fisher Theatre in Detroit. The cast included Hy Hazell,  Alfred Marks, Phyllis Newman, and John McMartin. The musical closed out-of-town and was not produced on Broadway.

The musical was produced by the Lyric Stage of Irving, Texas, in January 2013. The original orchestrations (by Philip J. Lang) were used, and the cast was headed by Christopher Carl, Luann Anderson, Bryant Martin, and Danielle Estes. Direction and choreography were by Ann Nieman.

Reception
The Detroit Press described it as "lesser Loesser." The Detroit Free Press wrote: "It's a Rolls-Royce of a show, a magnificent combination of artful scenery, lively choreography, and engaging people. But there's no gas in the Rolls-Royce tank," and Variety called it "disappointing." Cy Feuer and Abe Burrows were called in to help with revisions, and Fosse was willing to invest his own money in order to get the production to Boston, but after its closing on April 10, Loesser cancelled the rest of the tryout tour and the Broadway opening.

Song list
Ah, To Be Home Again 
Barabanchik 
Far, Far Away 
Hoorah For Jones 
I Hear Bells 
My Lover Is A Scoundrel 
Neither The Time 
Pleasures & Palaces 
The Sins of Sura 
Tears Of Joy 
Thunder And Lightning 
To Marry 
To Your Health 
In Your Eyes
Truly Loved

References

A Most Remarkable Fella: Frank Loesser and the Guys and Dolls in His Life by Susan Loesser, published by Hal Leonard (2000), pp. 245–246

External links
 Official Frank Loesser website

1965 musicals
Musicals based on plays
Musicals by Frank Loesser
Musicals choreographed by Bob Fosse